The 6th Lavant Cup was a motor race, run to Formula One rules, held on 19 April 1954 at Goodwood Circuit, West Sussex. The race was run over 7 laps, and was won by British driver Reg Parnell in a Ferrari 625. Second-placed driver Roy Salvadori in a Maserati 250F shared fastest lap with Parnell. Kenneth McAlpine was third in a Connaught Type A-Lea Francis.

Results

References 

Lavant Cup
Lavant
Lavant Cup
Lavant Cup